Russell J. Beichly (October 27, 1902 – April 20, 1996) was the Akron Zips men's basketball head coach from 1941 to 1959.  In 19 seasons, he guided the team to a 288–144 record.  Beichly was named Columbus Dispatch Ohio College Basketball Coach of the Year in 1959, following a 21–2 season.
A Wittenberg University graduate, Beichly coached Akron West High School to five straight OHSAA state tournament appearances (1931–1935), including a state championship in 1932.

References

1902 births
1996 deaths
Akron Zips athletic directors
Akron Zips baseball coaches
Akron Zips men's basketball coaches
Wittenberg Tigers football players
Wittenberg Tigers men's basketball players
High school basketball coaches in Ohio
Players of American football from Fort Lauderdale, Florida